Matilde Sánchez (born 1958) is an Argentine journalist, writer, and translator. Beginning in 1982 she developed a prolific career in the field of cultural journalism.

Professional career
Matilde Sánchez studied at the Escuela Superior de Comercio Carlos Pellegrini. Her first work was a biography of Hebe de Bonafini. In 1992 she published her first novel, La ingratitud, dedicated to her father and that takes place in Berlin. The subject of travel is recurrent in her work, and according to writer , "appears as a fundamental experience" from her first novels.

Her works have received favorable criticism from other writers, such as the Mexican Carlos Fuentes, who rated La ingratitud, El dock, and El desperdicio as particularly notable, and Beatriz Sarlo, who wrote about La ingratitud: "It's a text notable for its intelligence, for the steadfast security of writing without hesitation, and for the ability to exhibit a drama of feelings with the same distance as observing a foreign city." , in turn, described her in his personal blog as one of the best writers of her generation. The writer Miguel Vitagliano opined that El dock was the best novel of the 1990s.

Works

Fiction
 La ingratitud (1992). Novel originally published by Editorial A. Korn and reissued in 2011 by Editorial Mardulce.
 El Dock (1993). Novel. Editorial Planeta.
 La canción de las ciudades (1999). Travel stories published by Seix Barral.
 El desperdicio (2007). Novel. Editorial Alfaguara.
 Los daños materiales (2011). Penguin Random House Grupo Editorial Argentina.

Nonfiction
 Historias de vida (1985). Biography of Hebe de Bonafini. Editorial Nuevo Extremo.
 Las reglas del secreto (1993). Annotated anthology of the work of Silvina Ocampo. Economic Culture Fund.
 Evita, imágenes de una pasión. Report. Editorial Planeta. 
 Sueño rebelde. Report about Che Guevara. Editorial Icaria.

Awards and fellowships
 Guggenheim Fellowship (1994)
 Knight-Wallace Fellowship (University of Michigan)
 1st finalist 1992 Premio Planeta de Novela for El dock

Personal life

References

1958 births
20th-century Argentine women writers
20th-century Argentine writers
21st-century Argentine short story writers
21st-century Argentine women writers
21st-century Argentine writers
Argentine women novelists
Argentine women short story writers
Journalists from Buenos Aires
Living people